Seven segments of the historic Natchez Trace are listed on the National Register of Historic Places (NRHP).  Also there are additional NRHP-listed structures and other sites along the Natchez Trace, which served the travelers of the trace and survive from the era of its active use.

Segments
One segment within Tennessee is named simply "Old Natchez Trace".  Additionally, several segments in Mississippi and Alabama are listed with the name "Old Natchez Trace", followed by a secondary identifier in parentheses or by an additional name.  These listings are:

Old Natchez Trace in Tennessee

The Old Natchez Trace in Tennessee, is a large length of the Natchez Trace spanning several counties of Tennessee.  It is listed on the National Register under the name Old Natchez Trace.  The NRHP-listed linear district follows one route of the old Natchez Trace, but does not include other branches.  For example, at Old Town in Franklin, Tennessee, a different branch crossed Brown's Creek.  The counties spanned by the listing are: Lawrence, Hickman, Wayne, Williamson, Lewis, Davidson, and Maury County, Tennessee.

Old Natchez Trace (132-3T)

Old Natchez Trace (132-3T), located northeast of Port Gibson in Claiborne County, Mississippi, about 0.7 miles north of the Mangum Mound Site at milepost 45.7. The site is also known as the Grindstone Ford.  It is an original segment of the Natchez Trace.

The presence of the Natchez Road figured in the May 1, 1863 Battle of Port Gibson.  In that battle, Union forces under General Ulysses S. Grant's command, having crossed from the Louisiana side of the Mississippi, below Vicksburg, fought their way through a determined resistance by Confederate forces which at first bottled them up.  The Natchez Road was not located by the Union forces early in the battle.  Confederate General Bowen was concerned throughout the day's battle that Union forces would locate the Natchez Road and march directly upon Port Gibson, around Bowen's flank.  Bowen committed forces to attack the much larger Union forces in order to prevent them from finding it.  Eventually increasing numbers of Union troops threatened to overwhelm the Confederate forces and retreat was ordered, apparently without any flanking action along the Natchez Road taking place.  The Union troops occupied Port Gibson on May 2.

Old Natchez Trace (170-30)

Old Natchez Trace (170-30), a  area listed in 1976.  It preserves two separate remnants of the old Trace near milepost 104.5 and includes the site of Brashears' Stand, an inn operated by Turner Brashears from 1806 on. It is located just outside the eastern city limits of Ridgeland, Mississippi.

Old Natchez Trace (212-3K 213-3K)

Old Natchez Trace (212-3K 213-3K), located northeast of Kosciusko in Attala County, Mississippi, near milepost 174.

Old Natchez Trace (230-3H)

Old Natchez Trace (230-3H), located southwest of Mathiston in Choctaw County, Mississippi, near milepost 199.  It is located south of Mathiston at Natchez Trace Parkway milepost 198. It is a segment of the Natchez Trace located at a Natchez Trace Parkway interpretive stop.

Old Natchez Trace (310-2A)

Old Natchez Trace (310-2A), a  area listed in 1976 located 15 miles northwest of Florence, Alabama, off Alabama State Route 20 near milepost 336. It preserves a 400-foot section of the old Natchez Trace that had not been paved as of the mid-1970s, and an 850-foot section that has been paved. The paved portion is part of Lauderdale County's County Route 5.  The location is near to, and just southeast of, the Little Zion Church and the Cloverdale School, which in turn are south of the hamlet of Threet, Alabama.  Beyond the listed segment, the construction of Highway 20 "obliterated" evidence of the historic Natchez Trace.

Old Natchez Trace and Choctaw Agency Site

Old Natchez Trace and Choctaw Agency Site, in Ridgeland, Mississippi located at milepost 100.7.  This is located between Interstate 55 and Livingston Rd., west of Ridgeland, in Madison County, Mississippi.  It includes a 3.3-mile segment of the Natchez Trace (partially in the Natchez Trace Parkway right of way) and an archeological investigation site at the location that from 1811 to 1823 housed a government agency to the Choctaw.

Related NRHP-listed places
Also there are additional NRHP-listed structures and other sites along the Natchez Trace.  These include:
Old Town, Franklin, Tennessee, once the site of a Mississippian mound complex and Native American village located adjacent to the Trace and the Harpeth River. and more recently the location of an 1801 bridge built to carry the Natchez Trace road across Brown's Creek and a house built in the 1840s or 1850s. All three properties are listed on the National Register. 
Col. James Drane House, an antebellum house located at mile marker 180.7 on the Natchez Trace Parkway, at French Camp in Choctaw County, Mississippi.  The history of this house, from 1846, is mixed up with the history of the trace itself, and the home is a visitor's attraction along the modern Natchez Trace Parkway, which it adjoins.

Boyd Mounds Site (22MD512), a mound complex near Ridgeland in Madison County, Mississippi, at Mile 106.9 on the Natchez Trace Parkway, listed on the National Register as an archaeological site. It has six mounds and is situated next to a parking area off the Natchez Trace Parkway, accessible to visitors.
Janet's Mound, also listed as an archeological site with a restricted address, located at or near French Camp in Choctaw County, Mississippi

See also
National Register of Historic Places listings in Lauderdale County, Alabama
National Register of Historic Places listings in Attala County, Mississippi
National Register of Historic Places listings in Choctaw County, Mississippi
National Register of Historic Places listings in Claiborne County, Mississippi
National Register of Historic Places listings in Madison County, Mississippi
National Register of Historic Places listings in Davidson County, Tennessee
National Register of Historic Places listings in Hickman County, Tennessee
National Register of Historic Places listings in Lawrence County, Tennessee
National Register of Historic Places listings in Lewis County, Tennessee
National Register of Historic Places listings in Maury County, Tennessee
National Register of Historic Places listings in Wayne County, Tennessee
National Register of Historic Places listings in Williamson County, Tennessee

References

Natchez Trace
Roads on the National Register of Historic Places in Mississippi
Roads on the National Register of Historic Places in Tennessee
Roads on the National Register of Historic Places in Alabama
National Register of Historic Places in Lauderdale County, Alabama
National Register of Historic Places in Attala County, Mississippi
National Register of Historic Places in Choctaw County, Mississippi
National Register of Historic Places in Claiborne County, Mississippi
National Register of Historic Places in Madison County, Mississippi
National Register of Historic Places in Davidson County, Tennessee
National Register of Historic Places in Hickman County, Tennessee
National Register of Historic Places in Lawrence County, Tennessee
National Register of Historic Places in Lewis County, Tennessee
National Register of Historic Places in Maury County, Tennessee
National Register of Historic Places in Wayne County, Tennessee
National Register of Historic Places in Williamson County, Tennessee